Clarence Clement "Shovel" Hodge (July 6, 1893 – December 31, 1967), was an American Major League Baseball pitcher who played from 1920 to 1922 with the Chicago White Sox.

Hodge had a 14–15 record with a 5.17 earned run average in 75 career games in his three-year career. He batted .250 with 29 hits as a big leaguer.  

After his playing days he was an umpire in the Southern Association and Alabama State League.  He also managed as "Mutt" Hodge in the Alabama-Florida League in 1936, 1950 and 1955.

He was born in Clayton, Alabama, and died in Ft. Walton Beach, Florida.

External links

1893 births
1967 deaths
Americus Muckalees players
Baseball players from Alabama
Brunswick Pilots players
Charleston Sea Gulls players
Chicago White Sox players
Columbus Foxes players
Lincoln Links players
Major League Baseball pitchers
Minor league baseball managers
Minor league baseball umpires
Montgomery Lions players
Montgomery Rebels players
Nashville Vols players
New Orleans Pelicans (baseball) players
People from Clayton, Alabama
San Francisco Seals (baseball) players
Tulsa Oilers (baseball) players
Wichita Falls Spudders players